Fire of Moscow may refer to:

Fire of Moscow (1547) blamed on the tsar's maternal relatives from the Glinski family
Fire of Moscow (1571) by Crimean Tatars
Fire of Moscow (1812) concurrent with Napoleon's occupation